Denys Anatoliyovych Demyanenko (born 5 July 2000) is a Ukrainian professional footballer who plays as a striker for Desna Chernihiv.

Career
Born in Kyiv, Demyanenko is a product of the local Atlet youth sportive school system.

Desna-2 Chernihiv
In September 2018, he signed a deal with the Premier League club Desna Chernihiv, the main team in the city of Chernihiv. Here he played for Desna-2 Chernihiv, where he played 35 matches and scored 7 goals.

Desna Chernihiv
He also made his debut with the senior team in the Ukrainian Premier League on 26 February 2021, playing as the second-half substitute in a home winning match against FC Inhulets Petrove.

Personal life
Denys is a son of a Ukrainian football coach and former football defender Anatoliy Demyanenko.

Career statistics

Club

References

External links 
Statistics at UAF website (Ukr)

2000 births
Living people
Footballers from Kyiv
Ukrainian footballers
FC Desna Chernihiv players
FC Desna-2 Chernihiv players
Ukrainian Premier League players
Association football forwards